"Tourniquet" is a song by American rock band Breaking Benjamin. It was their third single off of their album Ember. The band made a video for the single, completing a trilogy of videos for the singles from the album.

Reception
The Daily Cardinal described the song as "a welcome and natural progression from their earlier works, signaling a very promising future for a band that is now two decades old" and that it features "a driving bass heavy drum line, a beautiful blending of tones and a textbook example of Burnley's vocal prowess, it stands as a gem of modern hard rock". In a fairly negative review, The Heights said: "Flutters of electric guitar notes cut through the saturated quality of the song's heavy instrumentation, and the raspy screams of the chorus have a ringing, auto-tuned quality that give the song a much-needed, distinguishable melody." MTSU Sidelines said the band "blend heavy intros and bridges with verses that build up to melodic choruses" with this song.

Charts

References

2017 songs
Breaking Benjamin songs
Songs written by Keith Wallen
Songs written by Jasen Rauch
Songs written by Benjamin Burnley